Gosnells was an electoral district of the Legislative Assembly of Western Australia. It was in existence from 1977 to 1989 and from 2008 to 2017. The seat was named after the suburb of Gosnells, and was located in Perth's southeastern suburbs. Gosnells was a safe seat for the Labor Party for most of its existence.

History
Gosnells was first created for the 1977 state election and abolished ahead of the 1989 state election. It was largely replaced by the district of Thornlie, which sitting Gosnells MP Yvonne Henderson contested and won. Gosnells was held at all times by the Labor Party.

A new seat named Gosnells was created for the 2008 state election when the number of metropolitan seats was increased in accordance with the new one vote one value legislation. The new district was drawn from large parts of the electorates of Kenwick, which was abolished, and Southern River, as well as a small part of Armadale. It included almost all of the suburb of Gosnells, large parts of the suburbs of Huntingdale and Thornlie and a small part of the suburb of Martin.

Gosnells was abolished for a second time in a redistribution prior to the 2017 state election. The sitting MP, Labor's Chris Tallentire, contested the new seat of Thornlie, while parts of Gosnells were also incorporated into Southern River.

Members for Gosnells

Election results

References

External links
 

Former electoral districts of Western Australia
1977 establishments in Australia
Constituencies established in 1977
2017 disestablishments in Australia
Constituencies disestablished in 2017